The Academy ratio of 1.375:1 (abbreviated as 1.37:1) is an aspect ratio of a frame of 35 mm film when used with 4-perf pulldown. It was standardized by the Academy of Motion Picture Arts and Sciences as the standard film aspect ratio in 1932, although similar-sized ratios were used as early as 1928.

History 

Silent films were shot at a 1.3 aspect ratio (also known as a 4:3 aspect ratio), with each frame using all of the negative space between the two rows of film perforations for a length of 4 perforations. The frame line between the silent film frames was very thin. When sound-on-film was introduced in the late 1920s, the soundtrack was recorded in a stripe running just inside one set of the perforations and cut into the 1.33 image. This made the image area "taller", usually around 1.19, which was slightly disorienting to audiences used to the 1.3 frame and also presented problems for exhibitors with fixed-size screens and stationary projectors.

From studio to studio, the common attempt to reduce the image back to a 1.3:1 ratio by decreasing the projector aperture in-house met with conflicting results.  Each movie theater chain, furthermore, had its own designated house ratio.  The first standards set for the new sound-on-film motion pictures were accepted in November 1929, when all major US studios agreed to compose for the Society of Motion Picture and Television Engineers (SMPE) designated size of  returning to the aspect ratio of 1.3:1.

Following this, Academy of Motion Picture Arts and Sciences (AMPAS) considered further alterations to this 1930 standard.  Various dimensions were submitted, and the projector aperture plate opening size of 0.825 in × 0.600 in was agreed upon. The resulting 1.375:1 aspect ratio was then dubbed the "Academy Ratio". On May 9, 1932, the SMPE adopted the same  projector aperture standard.

All studio films shot in 35 mm from 1932 to 1952 were shot in the Academy ratio. However, following the widescreen "revolution" of 1953, it quickly became an obsolete production format. Within several months, all major studios started matting their non-anamorphic films in the projector to wider ratios such as 1.6, 1.75, and 1.85, the last of which is still considered a standard ratio along with anamorphic (2.39).

1.375:1 is not totally obsolete, nonetheless, and can still be found in select recent films such as Alli Haapasalo's Girl Picture (2022), Joel Coen’s The Tragedy of Macbeth (2021), Wes Anderson's The Grand Budapest Hotel (2014), Paul Schrader's First Reformed (2017), Michel Hazanavicius's The Artist (2011),<ref>{{Cite web|url=http://www.studiodaily.com/2012/02/the-artists-cinematographer-speaks"The-Artists-Cinematographer-Speaks.|title = Studio Daily}}</ref> Gus Van Sant's Elephant (2003), Andrea Arnold's Fish Tank (2009), Kelly Reichardt's Meek's Cutoff (2010), Carlos Reygadas' Post Tenebras Lux (2012), and Don Hertzfeldt's It's Such a Beautiful Day (2012) as well on prints of Phil Lord, Christopher Miller's The Lego Movie (2014) and 4:3 prints of Steven Spielberg's Indiana Jones and the Kingdom of the Crystal Skull'' (2008) intended for 1.78:1 exhibition (a 2.39:1 version was also made).

Technical details 
The Academy ratio is not created in the camera, which has continued to use the full frame silent aperture gate for all 4-perf spherical filming. Rather, it is created in the married print, when the optical soundtrack and frame lines are added. Though most non-anamorphic film prints with a soundtrack are now framed to one of the non-anamorphic widescreen ratios, from 1.6 to 1.85, some still retain Academy-sized frames. These frames are then cropped in the projector by means of aperture masks used in the projector's gate in conjunction with a wider lens than would be used for projecting Academy ratio films.

During filming, using the 4-perf frame for widescreen framing when spherical lenses are used is sometimes considered to be wasteful in terms of the cost of film stock and processing, especially in the case of television, which does not require a film print. The 3-perf pulldown process was originally proposed in 1973, developed by Miklos Lente in 1976, and further developed by Rune Ericson in 1986 to solve this problem.

See also 
 Full frame (disambiguation)
 List of film formats
 Matte (filmmaking)

Notes

Motion picture film formats
Ratios